Marco Sanges is a photographer from Ostia, Rome. He has worked for Vogue Italia, Dolce&Gabbana, and published on several art and fashion magazines such as Sunday Telegraph.

Biography
Sanges lives in London, where he is known for his publications and exhibitions. He often works with filmmaker Alberto Bona, with whom he co-directed Pondering of a Lonely Wonderer and La sonnambula. His photographic book Circumstances  became a film, awarded at the Portobello Film Festival in 2008. Sanges is now developing the project Portraits, whose preview appeared on the website of la Repubblica.
His exhibition Big Scenes has been hosted at the Hackney Empire.

Works

Books
2004
 Circumstances

Films
2008
 Circumstances
 Pondering of a lonely wonderer
2009
 La sonnambula

Notes

External links
Official Site

Logos Books
Harper's Bazaar: Marco Sanges

1970 births
Living people
Italian photographers